Kilby Branch is a  long 1st order tributary to the Reddies River in Wilkes County, North Carolina.

Course
Kilby Branch rises about 5 miles southwest of Halls Mills, North Carolina and then flows south to join the Reddies River at about 3 miles northeast of Millers Creek, North Carolina.

Watershed
Kilby Branch drains  of area, receives about 51.0 in/year of precipitation, has a wetness index of 257.08, and is about 80% forested.

References

Rivers of North Carolina
Bodies of water of Wilkes County, North Carolina